City of Hope is a private, non-profit clinical research center, hospital and graduate school located in Duarte, California, United States.

City of Hope is best known as a cancer treatment center. It has been designated a Comprehensive Cancer Center by the National Cancer Institute. City of Hope has also been ranked one of the nation's Best Cancer Hospitals by U.S. News & World Report for over ten years and is a founding member of the National Comprehensive Cancer Network.

City of Hope played a role in the development of synthetic human insulin in 1978. The center has performed 13,000 hematopoietic stem cell transplants as of 2016 with patient outcomes that consistently exceed national averages.

History

In the late 19th and early 20th centuries, the spread of tuberculosis, also known as "consumption", was a growing concern in the United States and Europe. Owing to advancements in the scientific understanding of its contagious nature, a movement to house and quarantine sufferers became prevalent. Construction of tuberculosis sanatoria, including tent cities, became common in the United States, with many sanatoriums located in the Southwestern United States, where it was believed that the more arid climate would aid sufferers.

In 1913, the Jewish Consumptive Relief Association was chartered in Los Angeles, California, with the intent of raising money to establish a free, non-sectarian sanatorium for persons from throughout the United States diagnosed with tuberculosis. Opening January 11, 1914, the sanatorium originally consisted of two tents, one for patients and one for caregivers.

The sanatorium was nicknamed "the city of hope", and grew in size for several decades, continuing to raise funds, construct permanent facilities, hire doctors and treat increasing numbers of patients. Treating tuberculosis remained the sanatorium's focus until after World War II, when antibiotics for tuberculosis were discovered.

With tuberculosis becoming less prevalent, executive sanatorium director Samuel H. Golter began an initiative in 1946 to transform the sanatorium into a full medical center, supported by a research institute and post-graduate education. The Los Angeles Sanatorium officially changed its name to City of Hope National Medical Center in 1949. City of Hope's research institute was formally established in 1952. The City of Hope Graduate School of Biological Sciences was eventually chartered in 1993, and changed its name to the Irell & Manella Graduate School of Biological Sciences in 2009.

From 1953 to 1985, under executive director Ben Horowitz, City of Hope grew further in size and became best known for its cancer research and treatment programs. Horowitz raised City of Hope's annual average operating budget from $600,000 to more than $100 million during his tenure.

In 1981, the National Cancer Institute designated City of Hope a "Clinical Cancer Research Center". In 1983, the Arnold and Mabel Beckman Foundation awarded City of Hope a $10 million grant to establish the Beckman Research Institute of City of Hope; the Beckman Research Institute of City of Hope is now City of Hope's research moniker, and is one of six institutes/centers established by the Beckman Foundation in the United States.

From 1983 to the present, City of Hope continued to grow, expanding its Duarte campus with additional patient care, research and support facilities. City of Hope also operates a network of community practice clinics throughout Southern California.

Research and treatment
City of Hope's institutional goals are the prevention, treatment and cure of cancer and other life-threatening diseases, including diabetes and HIV/AIDS. As such, City of Hope's programs include the fields of brain, breast, gastrointestinal, gynecologic, thoracic and urologic cancers, as well as leukemia, lymphoma, and diabetes. City of Hope has been designated a Comprehensive Cancer Center by the National Cancer Institute, a branch of the National Institutes of Health.

City of Hope is a bench to bedside institution, with investments in basic, translational and clinical research. Faculty, residents and fellows conduct biomedical research, treat patients and educate medical professionals with the medical center serving as a teaching hospital.

Industrial, institutional, and National Cancer Institute-sponsored external peer-reviewed clinical trials are conducted at City of Hope.

Synthetic human insulin
In 1978, City of Hope researchers Arthur Riggs and Keiichi Itakura, working with Herbert Boyer of San Francisco-based biotechnology corporation Genentech, Inc., became the first scientists to produce synthetic human insulin.  City of Hope licensed patents based on Riggs's and Itakura's work to Genentech.  On August 13, 1999, City of Hope sued Genentech for allegedly cheating it out of its fair share of the profits from products based on the Riggs-Itakura patents.  On April 24, 2008, the Supreme Court of California affirmed the jury's award of $300 million in contractual damages to City of Hope but reversed the award of $200 million in punitive damages.

Hematopoietic cell transplantation
On January 13, 2011, City of Hope performed its 10,000th hematopoietic stem cell transplantation, which includes transplants of bone marrow, peripheral blood stem cells collected by apheresis, and umbilical cord stem cells.

By 2016, this has grown to over 13,000 stem cell transplants.

National Comprehensive Cancer Network

City of Hope is a founding member of the National Comprehensive Cancer Network (NCCN), a non-profit alliance of 21 U.S. cancer centers. The NCCN publishes clinical practice guidelines for oncological treatment among its member institutions. Member institutions include City of Hope, The University of Texas MD Anderson Cancer Center, St. Jude Children's Research Hospital/University of Tennessee Cancer Institute, Fox Chase Cancer Center in Philadelphia, Pennsylvania, Fred Hutchinson Cancer Research Center in Seattle, Washington, and 16 others.

Facilities

Patient Care Facilities
City of Hope's main campus in Duarte has several treatment facilities for inpatient and outpatient care, including the Helford Clinical Research Hospital, Michael Amini Transfusion Medicine Center, the Geri and Richard Brawerman Center for Ambulatory Care and the Women's Center.

In addition to the Duarte campus facilities, City of Hope also has community practice clinics located in Antelope Valley, Arcadia, Colton, Corona, Glendora, Mission Hills, Palm Springs, Pasadena, Rancho Cucamonga, Santa Clarita, Simi Valley, South Pasadena, West Covina, Torrance, and Newport Beach.

City of Hope is planning to build a $200 million cancer center, which would anchor a future medical campus south of the Orange County Great Park in Irvine in collaboration with FivePoint Holdings.

City of Hope is accredited by the Joint Commission, a private body which accredits over 17,000 health care organizations and programs in the United States.

Beckman Research Institute of City of Hope

Beckman Research Institute of City of Hope is one of six research facilities established by funding from the Arnold and Mabel Beckman Foundation. Its primary focus is research in the areas of cancer, diabetes, and HIV/AIDS. The institute shelters the City of Hope Irell & Manella Graduate School of Biological Sciences.

Research conducted at the institute has contributed to discoveries in the areas of recombinant DNA technology, gene therapy and monoclonal antibodies.

Center for Biomedicine & Genetics
City of Hope Center for Biomedicine & Genetics is a manufacturing facility specializing in the production of pharmaceutical-grade materials. The center also assists clinical investigators with translational research and clinical trials.

Irell & Manella Graduate School of Biological Sciences

The graduate school at City of Hope; the school is housed within the Arnold and Mabel Beckman Center for Cancer Immunotherapeutics & Tumor Immunology.

Patient housing
City of Hope has 40 temporary, on-site residential housing units for patients and their caregivers, with integrated hospice and palliative care.

Fundraising

City of Hope secures funding from a mixture of sources, including patient revenue, private donations, foundation support and federal research grants.

Annual fundraising events include Walk for Hope (a multi-city charity fundraising walk), Concert for Hope (a fundraising concert featuring celebrity musicians), and the City of Hope Celebrity Softball Challenge, held in Nashville, Tennessee.

City of Hope maintains eight regional fundraising offices in various cities throughout the United States, including Palm Desert, Phoenix, San Diego, San Francisco, Seattle, Chicago, Philadelphia, and Ft. Lauderdale, Florida.

The hospital also fundraises using giving days.  In 2016, Doctors' Day allowed patients to thank doctors by giving in their name. More than $9000 was raised through 60 gifts.  In 2017, City of Hope was planning a Bone Marrow Transplant Reunion Day and Survivors Day.  The hospital also participates in #GivingTuesday.  In 2015, the first time the hospital used the fundraiser, almost $120,000 were raised from 681 gifts.  In 2016, those numbers rose to almost $200,000 from more than 1500 gifts. In January 2017 City of Hope received a donation of more than $50 million to establish the Wanek Family Project for Type 1 Diabetes at City of Hope.

Affiliations
City of Hope is affiliated with the following institutions:
 Association of Community Cancer Centers
 National Cancer Institute
 National Comprehensive Cancer Network (founding member)
 National Bone Marrow Transplantation Research Network (founding member)
 National Gene Vector Laboratory
 Southern California Islet Cell Consortium (SC-IC)
 Islet Cell Transplant Center
 Juvenile Diabetes Research Foundation

Recognition
 In 2015, City of Hope was ranked as one of the "Best Hospitals" in cancer (#13) and gynecology (#41) by U.S. News & World Report.
 In 2009, City of Hope was listed among eight preferred cancer hospitals in the May/June issue of AARP Magazine, which published the results of a survey of doctors from throughout the United States conducted by Consumers' Checkbook, a Washington, D.C.-based non-profit health care provider rating service. Sampled doctors were asked "where they were most likely to send patients with extremely difficult cases".
 As of 2016, 52 City of Hope physicians are currently listed as "Top Doctors" by Castle Connolly Medical Ltd., as nominated by their peers in the medical profession. Castle Connolly is an independent company that surveys thousands of medical professionals in the United States and publishes the results in an annual consumer guide, America's Top Doctors.
 In December 2015, Charity Watch rates City of Hope / Beckman Research Institute charity an "A−" grade.
 In 2016, Charity Navigator gave City of Hope a 4 stars – its highest rating – for the 11th consecutive year.

Grants

National Cancer Institute grants
 Specialized Program of Research Excellence (SPORE) grant for translational research studies for Hodgkin and non-Hodgkin lymphoma - Five-year, $11.5 million.
 Grant to City of Hope's Division of Nursing Research for study of palliative care and quality-of-life concerns for lung cancer patients - Five-year, $13.4 million.
 Grant to City of Hope's Division of Cancer Etiology for the California Teachers Study, a survey of over 130,000 public school teachers and administrators to study the link between obesity, physical activity, hormone exposure and cancer - Three-year, $5 million.
 Grant to City of Hope's Department of Population Sciences to study genetic susceptibility for secondary malignancies as a result of treatment for cancer survivors - Five-year, $3.4 million.

Other grants
 California Institute for Regenerative Medicine (CIRM) grants for AIDS-related lymphoma and brain cancer research - $32.5 million.
 National Library of Medicine/National Institute of Diabetes and Digestive and Kidney Diseases grant to City of Hope's Department of Information Sciences to serve as coordinating center for distribution of islet cells and intestinal stem cells - $17 million.
 National Institute of Environmental Health Sciences grant to study ultraviolet light damage and its effect on mutagenesis - $2 million.

Contracts
 National Heart, Lung, and Blood Institute (NHLBI) contract to facilitate stem cell research from laboratory to clinical study; focus on development and manufacture of stem cell therapies—five-year, $8.6 million.

References

External links
 

Cancer hospitals
Cancer organizations based in the United States
Duarte, California
History of biotechnology
Hospitals in Los Angeles County, California
Medical research institutes in California
1913 establishments in California
Organizations established in 1913
NCI-designated cancer centers
City of Hope National Medical Center